An election to Dinefwr Borough Council was held in May 1991.  It was preceded by the 1987 election and followed, after local government reorganization, by the first election to Carmarthenshire County Council in 1995. On the same day there were elections to the other local authorities and community councils in Wales.

Results

Betws (one seat)

Brynamman (one seat)

Cilycwm (one seat)

Cwmllynfell (one seat)

Cynwyl Gaeo(one seat)

Dyffryn Cennen (one seat)

Garnant (two seats)

Glanamman (two seats)

Iscennen (one seat)

Llandeilo Castle (one seats)
Boundary Change

Llandeilo Tywi (one seat)

Llandovery Town (two seats)

Llandybie (three seats)

Llanegwad and Llanfynydd  (one seat)

Llangadog and Llansadwrn (one seat)

Llanfihangel Aberbythych  (one seat)

Llansawel (one seat)

Manordeilo and Salem (one seat)

Myddfai (one seat)
The ward was previously known as Llanddeusant and Myddfai

Pantyffynnon (one seat)

Penygroes (two seats)

Pontamman (one seat)
Boundary Change

Quarter Bach (one seat)

Saron (two seats)

Tirydail (one seat)

References

1991
1991 Welsh local elections